Ferhat Kıskanç (born 1 August 1982 in Cologne, West Germany) is a Turkish retired footballer.

References

External links
 
 Ferhat Kıskanç at worldfootball.net 

1982 births
Living people
Turkish footballers
German people of Turkish descent
Rot-Weiss Essen players
Rot-Weiß Oberhausen players
1. FC Köln II players
2. Bundesliga players
Footballers from Cologne
Association football midfielders